WLS (890 kHz) is a commercial AM radio station in Chicago, Illinois. Owned by Cumulus Media, through licensee Radio License Holdings LLC, the station airs a talk radio format. WLS has its radio studios in the NBC Tower on North Columbus Drive in the city's Streeterville neighborhood. Its non-directional broadcast tower is located on the southwestern edge of Tinley Park, Illinois in Will County.

WLS is a Class A station broadcasting on the clear-channel frequency of 890 kHz with 50,000 watts using a Nautel NX-50 transmitter.  A Harris DX-50 serves as a backup transmitter.  Both transmitters run in MDCL (Modulation Dependent Carrier Level) mode to improve efficiency. The station's daytime groundwave service contour covers portions of five states.  At night, its signal routinely reaches 38 states via skywave.  WLS participates in the Emergency Alert System's primary entry point network, serving that function for northern Illinois and western Indiana. The station's programming is also available to listeners in the Chicago metropolitan area with an HD Radio receiver via a simulcast on the HD2 digital subchannel of sister station WLS-FM.

History
Founded in 1924 by Sears, Roebuck and Company—with the call sign an abbreviation for Sears' "World Largest Store" slogan—WLS spent its early years as the radio outlet of the Prairie Farmer magazine. From 1928 until 1954, WLS shared their assigned frequency and overall broadcast operations with Blue Network-owned WENR until the Blue Network's successor, the American Broadcasting Company, merged WENR into WLS and eventually purchased it outright. The station's contemporary hit radio era from 1960 until 1989 saw WLS at a creative and ratings pinnacle headlined by personalities Dick Biondi, Larry Lujack, John Records Landecker and Bob Sirott. Since 1989, WLS has been a full-time talk radio outlet.

Sears ownership
In the 1920s, Sears, Roebuck and Company was a major retail and mail order company. To get farmers and people in rural communities to buy radio sets from its catalogs, Sears bought time on radio stations, and then decided to form its own station. Just before the permanent station was ready, Sears began broadcasts on March 21, 1924, as WBBX with noon programs using the WMAQ studios. WLS was one of the original 50,000-watt Class I-A clear-channel stations which did not share its original frequency of 870 kHz with any other station during nighttime hours, when AM radio signals can travel long distances via skywave.

Sears broadcast test transmissions from its own studios on April 9, 10 and 11, 1924, using the call sign WES (for "World's Economy Store"). Sears originally operated its station at the company's corporate headquarters on Chicago's West Side, which is also where the company's mail order business was located. On April 12, 1924, the station commenced officially, using the call letters WLS (for "World's Largest Store"), and broadcasting from its new studios in the Sherman House Hotel in downtown Chicago. The station's transmitter was originally located outside Crete, Illinois. On April 19, the station aired its first National Barn Dance. Harriet Lee was a WLS staff singer as part of the Harmony Team in the late 1920s. The popular contralto singer also played "Aunt May" on the Children's Hour show. The station shared time on the frequency with WCBD until November 11, 1928, at which point it began sharing time with WENR.

Prairie Farmer ownership

Sears opened the station in 1924 as a service to farmers and subsequently sold it to the Prairie Farmer magazine in 1928. The station moved to the Prairie Farmer Building on West Washington in Chicago, where it remained for 32 years. For a few months after ABC's 1960 purchase of it and the format change, the "bright new sound" that began in May 1960 was broadcast from the Prairie Farmer Building. WLS didn't make the move to downtown Michigan Avenue's Stone Container Building, located at 360 North Michigan Avenue, until October of that year. Thirty years later, it would move once more, to 190 North State in downtown Chicago. It was the scene of the National Barn Dance, which featured Gene Autry, Pat Buttram, and George Gobel, and which was second only to the Grand Ole Opry (itself a local National Barn Dance spinoff) in presenting country music and humor.

The station also experimented successfully in many forms of news broadcasting, including weather and crop reports. Its most famous news broadcast was the eyewitness report of the Hindenburg disaster by Herbert Morrison. Morrison and engineer Charles Nehlsen had been sent to New Jersey by WLS to cover the arrival of the Hindenburg for delayed broadcast. Their recordings aired the next day on May 7, 1937, the first time that recordings of a news event were ever broadcast.

In the fall of 1937, the station was one of several Chicago radio stations to donate airtime to Chicago Public Schools for a pioneering program in which the school district provided elementary school students with distance education amid a polio outbreak-related school closure.

Blue Network
Starting in the 1930s, WLS was an affiliate of the Blue Network of the National Broadcasting Company (NBC), and as such aired the popular Fibber McGee and Molly and Lum and Abner comedy programs (both produced at the studios of Chicago's NBC-owned stations, WENR and WMAQ) during their early years. When the Federal Communications Commission forced NBC to sell the Blue Network, WLS maintained its affiliation with the network under its new identity, the American Broadcasting Company (ABC). Under this affiliation, some programs from the network that were not commercially sponsored or which were scheduled to cross the time that WLS and WENR shifted its use of the same frequency (such as baseball or football games) were transferred to air on a third Blue Network/ABC affiliate in Chicago, WCFL. Blue/ABC network broadcasts of addresses by labor leaders were also shifted away from WLS and WENR to WCFL, which was owned at the time by the Chicago Federation of Labor.

In 1931, the station's power was increased from 5,000 watts to 50,000 watts, and the station began sharing the transmitter of WENR near Downers Grove, Illinois. In 1938, the station's transmitter was moved to Tinley Park, Illinois.

WENR
WENR has its origins in a 10-watt station started in late 1924 by E. N. Rauland, whose company manufactured the All-American brand of radios. On March 19, 1925, he received his license for WENR broadcasting 100 watts at 1130 kHz. By fall 1925, WENR was using a 1,000-watt transmitter designed by Rauland himself. The station shared time on the frequency with WBCN, owned at that time by the Southtown Economist newspaper. By 1927, the two stations had changed frequencies to 1040 kHz.

By 1927, Chicago investor Samuel Insull had purchased both stations, through his company Great Lakes Broadcasting. On September 1, 1928, WBCN was discontinued, and WENR began full-time operations on the frequency. In November 1928, the station once more changed frequencies, this time to 870 kHz, sharing time with WLS, and it became the first Chicago radio station operating 50,000 watts of power from a new transmitter in Downers Grove, Illinois. Insull moved his stations first into Chicago's Strauss Building, and then to his own Civic Opera Building.

In 1931, WENR was sold to the National Broadcasting Company for approximately $1 million. The station became part of NBC's Blue Network. NBC moved WENR's studios to the Merchandise Mart, its Chicago headquarters.

In the fall of 1937, the station was one of several Chicago radio stations to donate airtime to Chicago Public Schools for a pioneering program in which the school district provided elementary school students with distance education amid a polio outbreak-related school closure.

Changes were made regarding AM frequencies in 1941 as a result of the North American Regional Broadcasting Agreement; this moved WENR and WLS from 870 to 890 kHz. In August 1943, NBC was ordered to divest itself of the Blue Network and its stations; WENR and Blue were sold to Edward J. Noble. In 1945 the Blue Network would be renamed as the American Broadcasting Company. The station continued on at the Mart, as NBC's tenant, until 1952 when it moved back to the Civic Opera House. Paul Harvey worked as an evening newscaster on WENR from 1944 to 1951.

ABC ownership

WENR and WLS used the same frequencies in a time-sharing arrangement until 1954, when ABC (then known as American Broadcasting-Paramount Theatres) bought a 50 percent interest in WLS and combined the stations.

In November 1959, ABC announced its purchase of Prairie Farmer and its half of WLS, giving ABC full ownership of the station.

The WLS Musicradio era

On May 2, 1960, at 6 a.m., WLS went with a full-time Top 40 format. Mort Crowley was the first disc jockey under the new format, and the first song played was "Alley-Oop" by The Hollywood Argyles, four weeks before it debuted on the Hot 100. The station's jingles were sung by the Anita Kerr Singers.

Ralph Beaudin was the station's president and general manager, and oversaw the station's transformation into a Top 40 station. Sam Holman was the station's program director and an afternoon DJ. Beaudin and Holman were both brought in from KQV in Pittsburgh, Pennsylvania. Ed Grennan, an announcer on the station since 1959, was retained as a DJ under the new format. Star disc jockey Dick Biondi, a 1998 inductee into the National Radio Hall of Fame, was brought in from WEBR in Buffalo, New York. Biondi remained on the station until 1963. Other DJs who were brought in for the station's new format included Bob Hale from WIRL in Peoria, Illinois, Gene Taylor from WOKY in Milwaukee, Wisconsin, Mort Crowley from WADO in New York City, and Jim Dunbar from WDSU in New Orleans, Louisiana.

In October 1960, Art Roberts joined the station as a DJ, having previously worked at WKBW in Buffalo, New York. Clark Weber joined the station as a DJ, remaining with the station until 1969. In 1963, Ron "Ringo" Riley joined the station as a DJ, having previously worked at WHK in Cleveland, Ohio. Dex Card joined the station in 1964, and hosted the Silver Dollar Survey countdown until 1967, the longest of the show's hosts. In 1967, Larry Lujack joined WLS as a DJ, four months after he had started at the station's top competitor WCFL. Lujack returned to WCFL in 1972, but rejoined WLS in 1976, remaining with the station until 1987. In 1972, John Records Landecker joined WLS, remaining with the station until 1981. Landecker returned to WLS in 1986, and remained with the station until its format was changed in 1989. Tommy Edwards joined the station as production director in 1972, becoming program director one year later, and later becoming a mid-day DJ. Bob Sirott joined WLS in June 1973, remaining with the station until December 1979.

Other DJs on WLS during its top 40 era included Chuck Buell, Kris Erik Stevens, Joel Sebastian, Gary Gears, Jerry Kay, Yvonne Daniels, Brant Miller, Tom Kent, Steve King, Jeff Davis and Fred Winston. Some of the production directors responsible for the sound of WLS were Ray Van Steen, Hal Widsten, Jim Hampton, Bill Price and Tommy Edwards.

In the 1960s, WLS was a major force in introducing new music and recording artists. The first US airplay of a record by The Beatles ("Please Please Me") was on Dick Biondi's show on February 8, 1963.

WLS was voted by broadcasters nationally as "The Station of the Year" in 1967, 1968 and 1969. John Rook was named "Program Director of the Year" in 1968 and 1969 as WLS was estimated attracting 4.2 million listeners weekly by Pulse research.

WLS also produced the weekly Silver Dollar Survey from October 14, 1960, to December 22, 1967, broken by the Silver Beatle Survey on February 21, 1964 (see picture to the right) and the Super Summer Survey from May 5, 1967, to August 25, 1967. The survey nominally contained 40 current listings, except for occasional weeks when it contained fewer current listings, usually 20, plus a special listing of greatest oldies. From 18 September 1964 through 25 December 1964, the survey consisted of the top 30 pop hits, followed by the top 10 R&B hits. Thereafter, the survey changed its name numerous times (89 WLS Hit Parade, 89 WLS Chicagoland Hit Parade, WLS Musicradio 89, etc.). Starting with the July 20, 1970 survey, the number of listings dropped from 40 to 30, then varying from 25 to 40 starting June 26, 1972, then dropping to 15 by March 9, 1974, then increasing to a high of 45 by the end of 1975. No "take home" surveys were printed from March 13, 1972, through July 16, 1973 (these were limited to one poster-size weekly survey displayed at record shops). The year-end listing was the 20 greatest hits of the year for each year from 1963 through 1966, increased to 89 from 1967 onward.

Like many AM radio stations of the seventies, WLS edited many of the songs they played into a more "radio-friendly" or "radio edit" (a term still used today) format, usually 3–4 minutes in length. Other special editions of some Top 40 songs exclusively made for their broadcasting were done by the musicians themselves or sometimes by the WLS audio engineers. An example of these included Reunion's 1974 song "Life Is a Rock (But the Radio Rolled Me)". Reunion changed the song's lyrics from "Life is a rock but the radio rolled me" to "Life is a rock/WLS rolled me". A similar version was made for competitor WCFL. Another "WLS-only" version was a combination of Captain and Tennille's "Love Will Keep Us Together" and "Por Amor Viviremos", which featured alternating English and Spanish vocals.

By the mid-1970s, WLS became conservative about introducing new songs, and many record promoters referred to the station as the "World's Last Station" to add new releases for airplay, usually only after the songs had reached the top 10 on the Billboard Hot 100. However, in 1974, the station started playing the track "Lady" by the Chicago band Styx from an older album of theirs, resulting in other stations around the country adding the song and making the track Styx' first national Top 40 hit.

During the 1970s WLS ran a Sunday night music interview program called "Musicpeople."

In 1984, Steve Dahl and Garry Meier's program was moved to WLS from WLS-FM, over the objections of the duo, who attempted to have their contract declared invalid. Nevertheless, Dahl and Meier drew higher ratings on WLS than they had on WLS-FM. Dahl and Meier left WLS in 1986, returning to WLUP.

Well into the 1980s, WLS continued as a mainstream Top 40 formatted station. However, beginning in 1985, the station would begin to undergo major changes. In January 1985, the station began airing Sex Talk on Sunday nights, hosted by Phyllis Levy, a sex therapist. By 1988, WLS was airing adult contemporary music, liberally laced with oldies and standards, with talk programming at night.
During the 1980s Les Grobstein was hired as the first and only full-time Sports Director of WLS and broke the story of Cub Manager Lee Elia's famous tirade on April 29, 1983, after a loss to the Dodgers, which included 54 profanities.

Talkradio era

In June 1989, WLS announced it was going all-talk by the end of the summer. Rumors were that the change was to happen September 1. Air personalities were becoming more talk-intensive anyway and midday talk was added as well. But quietly, with no warning, on August 23, 1989, at 7 P.M., WLS stopped playing music altogether. Phil Duncan was the last DJ to play music on WLS, and as Duncan finished up his show, a voice in the back of the studio (that of then-WYTZ worker Steven Craig) was heard saying "Goodnight!" (Craig unknowingly (and unofficially) became the last live voice on Musicradio WLS.) Appropriately, the last song was "Just You 'n' Me" by Chicago. WLS then became a talk station, with Sally Jesse Raphael as its first host. In the beginning of the talk format, WLS featured high-rated talk talents from around the country, such as Bob Lassiter from Tampa Bay, Stacy Taylor from San Diego and the station's biggest hit, Rush Limbaugh out of New York. After a few years, however, Lassiter, Taylor and some of their other national hosts were dropped in favor of more local hosts. Jay Marvin also had several stints on WLS, where he was one of the few liberal voices on its political talk shows, which had mostly conservative viewpoints. The station iserved as the "flagship" broadcast outlet for the Sunday night, national political talk show, Beyond the Beltway with Bruce DuMont.

By 1992, WLS had such low ratings that ABC's national management was planning on flipping the station to a satellite-fed country format (management went so far as to distribute an all-staff memo and hosts being told they were about to be let go). However, in what was described as an "eleventh hour decision", ABC cancelled the planned format change due to convincing from local management. Throughout the 1990s, ratings began to grow, with the station occasionally ranked in the Top 10.

On Memorial Day, 2007, WLS took a cue from sister station WABC and ran a special day of musical programming, "The Big 89 Rewind," featuring live visits from Larry Lujack, Tommy Edwards, Fred Winston, Chris Shebel, Jeff Davis, John Records Landecker, Tom Kent, and other D.J.s, sounders, and airchecks from the Musicradio era. The broadcasts re-aired on Independence Day 2007, and there was a new Rewind in 2008.

Cumulus ownership

ABC-owned radio stations which were not affiliated with ESPN Radio or Radio Disney, including WLS, were sold to Citadel Broadcasting on June 12, 2007, with Citadel licensing the name ABC Radio for 2 years after the sale. Citadel was bought by Cumulus Media on September 16, 2011.

Cumulus Media terminated its affiliation with overnight radio program "Coast to Coast AM" on many of its stations, including WLS. In the spring of 2012, it began airing its own "Red Eye Radio."

Longtime morning show hosts Don and Roma Wade retired in December 2012. They had been off the air since October due to Don Wade's cancer treatments. On September 6, 2013, Don Wade died of a brain tumor.

Cumulus radio stations made a break with ABC at the end of 2014, when they no longer carried ABC News Radio. WLS and most Cumulus news/talk stations began running Westwood One News on January 1, 2015. (Westwood One is a Cumulus subsidiary.) This lasted until August 30, 2020, when Westwood One shuttered its news service, and as of August 31, 2020, the station is once again affiliated with ABC News Radio.

In January 2017, WLS and WLS-FM moved from its 190 N. State Street studios to its new studios in NBC Tower on North Columbus Drive in Streeterville. In addition, the station became the new affiliate of NBC News Radio. On January 2, 2017, the station added the on-air team of Bob Sirott and Marianne Murciano from WGN (AM); the former marking his return to WLS for the first time since 1980. However, Sirott and Murciano were cut from the station's lineup, beginning January 1, 2018.

Sports
On June 23, 2015, WLS announced that the station had picked up broadcasting rights for Chicago White Sox baseball starting with the 2016 season. In addition, WLS had also picked up broadcasting rights for the Chicago Bulls, beginning with the 2016-17 NBA season. Due to Cumulus's January 2018 Chapter 11 bankruptcy, the carriage rights were terminated in the filing; the Bulls moved to WSCR with immediate effect at the start of February, with the White Sox shifting to WGN several weeks later.

In the 2015–16 season, WLS carried Notre Dame Fighting Irish college football and basketball games. In 2016, Notre Dame moved to AM 1000 WMVP.

Programming

Talk shows
Weekdays on WLS, two local talk show hosts are heard:  Steve Cochran is in morning drive time and John Howell hosts late afternoons. The rest of the weekday schedule consists of nationally syndicated conservative talk shows from co-owned Westwood One:  Chris Plante, Dan Bongino, The Ben Shapiro Show, The Mark Levin Show, Red Eye Radio and America in the Morning.

Weekends feature shows on money, health, real estate, technology, travel and cars. Syndicated weekend shows include Kim Komando and Ric Edelman, as well as repeats of weekday shows. Some weekend hours are paid brokered programming. Most hours begin with world and national news from ABC News Radio.

References

External links 

Chicago's Legendary WLS: Part I, The Studios (2004)
Chicago's Legendary WLS: Part II, The Transmitter (2004)

LS
News and talk radio stations in the United States
Radio stations established in 1924
Cumulus Media radio stations
1924 establishments in Illinois
Former subsidiaries of The Walt Disney Company
Clear-channel radio stations